Tom Harrington is a Canadian radio and television journalist for the Canadian Broadcasting Corporation. He is currently the anchor of CBC Radio One's afternoon news program The World This Hour.

A graduate of Memorial University of Newfoundland, Harrington joined the CBC as a sports reporter for CBC Calgary before moving to CBC Montreal. He later moved to the national CBC Sports division as anchor of National Sports, a sports news program on CBC Newsworld, and as a sports reporter for The National. His work for the CBC included covering Commonwealth Games, Pan-American Games and Olympic Games events. He was also heard as an occasional guest host on radio news programs such as The Current, The World at Six, As It Happens and Cross Country Checkup. He is a four-time Gemini Award nominee for best sports host.

He joined CBC Television's consumer affairs newsmagazine Marketplace as cohost in 2010, remaining with the program until joining The World This Hour in 2015.

References

Canadian television sportscasters
Canadian radio sportscasters
Canadian television reporters and correspondents
Canadian radio news anchors
Memorial University of Newfoundland alumni
People from St. John's, Newfoundland and Labrador
Journalists from Newfoundland and Labrador
CBC Radio hosts
Living people
CBC Television people
20th-century Canadian journalists
21st-century Canadian journalists
Canadian sports journalists
Year of birth missing (living people)